is a 2023 Japanese superhero film directed and written by Hideaki Anno. Produced to celebrate the 50th anniversary of Kamen Rider, it is the third reboot of a tokusatsu series to be adapted by Anno, following Shin Godzilla and Shin Ultraman. 

Anno first proposed the project after becoming close with Toei producer Muneyuki Kii during the production of his 2012 film Evangelion: 3.0 You Can (Not) Redo. Initially, Toei aimed for the film to be released in 2021, however, production was delayed due to the outbreak of the COVID-19 pandemic. Principal photography began on October 3, 2021, and wrapped in either late 2021 or at the end of January 2022. The film was completed on March 6, 2023.

The film premiered in Japan at selected theaters on March 17, 2023, and was released nationwide on March 18, 2023, grossing  within three days of its release. Executive producer Shinichirō Shirakura stated in April 2021 that the film will be released internationally, but the exact date was undecided.

Plot

An intellectual named Takeshi Hongo is kidnapped by a cult known as SHOCKER (The Sustainable Happiness Organization with Computational Knowledge Embedded Remodeling) and transformed into the mutant cyborg, GRASSHOPPER AUGMENT 01. After Hongo’s escape from SHOCKER, SHOCKER sends one of its mutants, SPIDER AUGMENT 01 after Hongo and his ally, Ruriko Midorikawa. Ruriko is captured by SPIDER AUGMENT 01 but is saved by Takeshi who transforms into his cyborg form and brings to their Hideout. At the hideout, Ruriko’s father, Dr Hiroshi Midorikawa reverts Hongo back to his civilian form with PRANA life energy. Unfortunately, Hiroshi is murdered by SPIDER AUGMENT 01 who kidnaps his daughter as well. Takeshi defeats SPIDER AUGMENT 01 with his cyborg capabilities and is dubbed “Kamen Rider”. 

Later, at the request of the Japanese government, Takeshi and Ruriko defeat the SHOCKER mutants. With information from government officials Taki and Tobei Tachibana, Ruriko confronts SHOCKER mutant BAT AUGMENT 01 who intends to use a virus to control the population. Hongo assists Ruriko in defeating BAT AUGMENT 01. Ruriko and Hongo also defeat another SHOCKER mutant, WASP AUGMENT 01 who intends to save mankind through slavery. Taki and Tobei’s men defeat another SHOCKER mutant, SCORPION AUGMENT 01 but are killed by Ruriko’s brother, Ichiro, a SHOCKER executive. SHOCKER sends another mutant cyborg,  Hayato Ichimonji, also known as GRASSHOPPER AUGMENT 02 to face Takeshi and Ruriko. Through Ruriko's strategies, Hayato is freed from his brainwashing by SHOCKER. Not long after, Ruriko is killed by the MANTIS CHAMELEON AUGMENT, a SHOCKER hybrid mutant who Hayato defeats. 

Hongo goes to Shocker's base again by himself, but SHOCKER mutants get in their way. Hayato appears there to assist Hongo. After defeating the mutants, the duo battles Ichiro who transforms into Kamen Rider No. 0 and intercepts them. Takeshi manages to defeat Kamen Rider No. 0, with the price of his life in the process. He entrusts Hayato with his helmet and red muffler. Hayato wears Takeshi’s helmet, which has Takeshi's consciousness uploaded into it to assist Hayato, who continues to fight as Kamen Rider No. 2.

Cast
 Sosuke Ikematsu as Takeshi Hongo, a brilliant man who will transform into the cyborg Grasshopper Augment-01, Kamen Rider.
 Minami Hamabe as Ruriko Midorikawa, a woman who aids Hongo in his war against Shocker.
 Tasuku Emoto as Hayato Ichimonji, a photojournalist who will transform into the cyborg Grasshopper Augment-02, Kamen Rider No. 2.
 Nanase Nishino as Hiromi, a senior member of Shocker who can transform into Wasp Augment-01
 Shinya Tsukamoto as Dr. Hiroshi Midorikawa, Ruriko's father
 Toru Tezuka as Bat Augment-01, a senior member of Shocker
 Yutaka Takenouchi as Tobei Tachibana
 Takumi Saitoh as Taki
 Masami Nagasawa as Scorpion Augment-01
 Kanata Hongō as Mantis Chameleon Augment-01
 Nao Ōmori as the voice of Spider Augment-01
 Tori Matsuzaka as the voice of Shocker’s AI, K
 Mikako Ichikawa as Shoko Midorikawa, Ichiro's mother
 Ken Yasuda
 Tōru Nakamura
 Suzuki Matsuo as the Founder of SHOCKER 
 Mirai Moriyama as Ichiro Midorikawa, Dr. Midorikawa's son, Ruriko's elder brother, and a Shocker executive who can transform into the Butterfly Augment-01, Kamen Rider No.0. His backstory is told in the spin off manga, There is no true peace in this world: Shin Kamen Rider SHOCKER Side

Production

Crew

 Hideaki Anno – director, writer, concept designer
 Katsuro Onoue – associate director
 Ikki Todoroki – deputy director
 Shinichirō Shirakura – executive producer
 Yutaka Izubuchi – designer
 Mahiro Maeda – designer
 Ikuto Yamashita – designer
 Atsuki Sato – VFX supervisor
 Hiromasa Inoue – VFX producer
 Masayo Ohno – VFX producer
 Linto Ueda – post-production supervisor

Personnel taken from Eiga.com.

Development
Anno first proposed Shin Kamen Rider after growing close with Toei producer Muneyuki Kii during the production of his 2012 film Evangelion: 3.0 You Can (Not) Redo. Planning for the film began in 2015 with Anno as director and screenwriter. Toei initially aimed for release in 2021, the year of the Kamen Rider franchise's 50th anniversary; however, production was delayed due to the outbreak of the COVID-19 pandemic.

The film was announced in a press conference on April 3, 2021, the 50th anniversary of the franchise's first episode. Anno, who grew up with the original 1971 Kamen Rider series, expressed his admiration for the franchise, calling it "epoch-making" and expressing a desire to "give back in some small way". Executive producer Shinichirō Shirakura revealed the teaser poster, illustrated by Mahiro Maeda, as well as plans for a Japanese release in March 2023.

In September 2021, the film's official Twitter account announced the script had been finalized, and shooting was soon to begin. The first teaser was revealed at a press conference on September 30, along with the casting of leads Ikematsu and Hamabe. The teaser is a faithful recreation of the original series' opening title sequence, and revealed the designs of Kamen Rider, his Cyclone motorcycle and the iconic villain Spider Man. A statue of the film's iteration of Kamen Rider was displayed at the Hideaki Anno Exhibition, alongside statues of Shin Godzilla and Shin Ultraman'''s titular characters.

On October 10, the film's official Twitter account revealed that Hayato Ichimonji/Kamen Rider 2 would appear in the film. On January 1, 2022, it was revealed that Tasuku Emoto would play the role.

Design
The film's version of Kamen Rider was designed by Anno, Maeda, and Ikuto Yamashita. A number of approaches to modernizing the design were considered, but the designers felt they steered too close to previous reimaginings such as Kamen Rider: The First and Kamen Rider Black. It was ultimately decided to go "back to basics," retaining the overall design of the original 1971 suit with only subtle alterations.

Yamashita also designed the film's incarnation of the Cyclone, Kamen Rider's motorcycle. Use of a fully computer-generated bike was proposed, but ultimately rejected due to concerns over budget and screentime. The designer realized it would be impossible to faithfully recreate the original Cyclone's silhouette with a modern bike; As such, production focused on finding a practical vehicle suited for the film's action sequences, which then served as the base for Yamashita's design.

Yutaka Izubuchi, a veteran designer who worked on the previous film reboot, Kamen Rider: The First, designed the Kumo Augment-01, the film's incarnation of Spider Man.

Filming
Principal photography began on October 3, 2021. While the film's official Twitter account proclaimed filming wrapped in late 2021, Anno stated that he completed filming at the end of January 2022 in Shin Ultraman Design Works.

Like Shin Ultraman, several sequences in the film were shot on iPhones, using camera movements, lens sizes, angles, and zoom timing to mimic modern cinematic techniques.

Release
Marketing

In February 2022, Toho, Khara, Toei, and Tsuburaya Productions announced a collaborative project titled "Shin Japan Heroes Universe" for merchandise, special events and tie-ins. The project unites films that Anno had worked on that bear the katakana title "Shin" (シン・), such as Evangelion: 3.0+1.0 Thrice Upon a Time, Shin Godzilla, Shin Ultraman and Shin Kamen Rider. A statue depicting the film's incarnation of Kamen Rider was displayed alongside a statue of the 2016 incarnation of Godzilla and a statue of the 2022 incarnation of Ultraman as part of the Hideaki Anno Exhibition at the Abeno Harukas Art Museum, located in Abeno-ku, Osaka.

The theatrical release poster and a second trailer, as well as additional casting information, were unveiled on May 13th, 2022, alongside the theatrical release of Shin Ultraman.

TheatricalShin Kamen Rider'' premiered at selected Japanese theaters on March 17, 2023 at 6:00 p.m. and was released nationwide the following day. The cast had a "stage greeting" on the former date and the film was also screened in IMAX, 4DX and Dolby Cinema theaters. In April 2021, Shirakura declared the film would be released internationally, but the exact date was undecided.

Notes

References

Citations

Bibliography

External links

  
 Official webpage at Toei 
 

2020s Kamen Rider films
2020s Japanese films
2020s Japanese superhero films
2020s Japanese-language films
2020s superhero films
4DX films
Cyborg films
IMAX films
Kamen Rider films
Film productions suspended due to the COVID-19 pandemic
Films directed by Hideaki Anno
Films impacted by the COVID-19 pandemic
Films produced by Kazutoshi Wadakura
Films with screenplays by Hideaki Anno
Toei Company films